The Tanks Are Coming is a 1951 war film directed by Lewis Seiler and starring Steve Cochran and Philip Carey. The story is set during World War II in 1944 France. The film chronicles the U.S. 3rd Armored Division's advance across northern France and its attempt to pierce the Siegfried Line.

Not to be confused with the 20-minute educational film of the same name from 1941.

Plot
Normandy, 1944, post-D-Day. A tank commander, Sgt. Joe Davis, is very popular with his men. So much so, that when he is killed during a brief skirmish with the enemy, his crew fall into despondency. That is, until Davis's replacement, Sgt. "Sully" Sullivan, shows up. To the men, his arrival is like a splash of ice water. Sullivan rouses them out of their funk by ordering the immediate discard of Davis's personal effects. Further, he replaces their tank driver with a known drunkard named Tucker. Sullivan's anatagonism doesn't stop there. He challenges the loyalty of a German-American crew member named "Heinie." He verbally bullies another man, Kolowicz, into near-fisticuffs.

In short, Sgt. Sullivan succeeds in transforming a crew of emotional zombies, bemoaning their fate, into an over-achieving squad of efficient killers. All of this, despite their collective hatred of Sullivan. But in the following months, as they fight their way to the Siegfried Line, both Sullivan and the men begin to share a mutual respect.

Cast
 Steve Cochran as Francis Aloysius 'Sully' Sullivan
 Philip Carey as Lt. Rawson
 Mari Aldon as Patricia Kane
 Paul Picerni as Danny Kolowicz
 Harry Bellaver as Lemchek
 James Dobson as George 'Ike' Eisenhower
 George O'Hanlon as Sgt. Tucker
 John McGuire as Col. Matthews
 Robert Boon as Heinrich 'Heinie' Weinburger
 Michael Steele as Sgt. Joe Davis
 Roy Roberts as the Commanding General (uncredited)

References

External links 
 
 
 

1951 films
Films directed by Lewis Seiler
Western Front of World War II films
American black-and-white films
1951 war films
Films about armoured warfare
Films scored by William Lava
American war films
1950s English-language films
1950s American films